Quentin Lepoutre (born 30 March 1987), known professionally as Myd , is a French musician, record producer, singer, sound engineer and DJ. He is one of the four members of the electronic band Club Cheval. After releasing tracks on labels Marble and Bromance, he continued his solo career and signed to Ed Banger Records in 2017. He has produced tracks for artists like Brodinski and French rappers such as SCH, Lacrim, Georgio and Alonzo.

Career
Myd studied sound engineering from 2008 to 2011 in Paris at the prestigious cinema school La Fémis when he met Panteros666, Sam Tiba and Canblaster. They decided to make music together and they became Club Cheval.

Alongside the band, in 2011, Myd released his first solo EP on Marble Records (Para One, Surkin and Bobmo label) and started to tour as a DJ internationally. At that time he did remixes for big names like Yelle or Two Door Cinema Club.

In 2014, he co-composed entirely with Brodinski and Kore, Brodinski's first album Brava including featurings with Slim Thug, ILOVEMAKONNEN and Young Scooter. The same year, he moved to Kore's studios in Paris from who he became closer.

In 2015, he co-composed French rap hits with Kore for SCH, Lacrim or Alonzo. He received in 2016 his first platinum disc. At that time he released his house influenced EP, Número Uno on Bromance Records, Brodinski's label.

In 2016, Club Cheval released their debut album titled Discipline. After the album's release, all of the band members continued their solo careers and Club Cheval was put on hiatus.

In 2017, he composed the soundtrack for the French drama film Bloody Milk (French title: Petit paysan), directed by Hubert Charuel. For this film, Myd was nominated for the 43rd César Awards in the "Best Original Music" category and he received the "Valois de la musique" at the 10th Angoulême Film Festival.

The same year, after the defunct of Bromance Records, he became a member of Ed Banger Records. His first release on Ed Banger is an EP, consisting of 3 tracks, called All Inclusive. The release of the EP is accompanied by a video for "All Inclusive", directed by Alice Moitié, as well as a photo album produced by the latter. We see Myd on a cruise ship, in all its forms, which suggests that the clip is a hidden camera.

In 2018, he released the single "Muchas" featuring Cola Boyy. The official video, directed by Alice Moitié, features around thirty false look-alikes of him. The same year, he produced more than half of the songs on the album XX5, by French rapper Georgio.

In 2019, he released an EP, consisting of 3 tracks, titled Superdiscoteca. The same year, he produced the album Flavourite CÂLÂ, by Sônge.

In 2020, during the first lockdown due to the COVID-19 pandemic, he launches a morning show called CoMyd-19 in which he delivers a DJ set and set up a hotline. CoMyd-19 was voted Best Live Stream by Billboard and was renewed for a second season at the end of 2020 during the second lockdown. In June, he released "Together We Stand", which is the lead single for his debut album Born a Loser.
On 28 October 2020 he released a second single, "Moving Men", featuring Mac DeMarco. To promote the release of "Moving Men", he toured Paris in a truck with Pedro Winter. On 8 April 2021 he released the final single titled "Let You Speak". The complete album Born a Loser, including collaborations with Juan Wauters and Bakar, released on 30 April 2021 by Ed Banger.

On 29 April 2021 Myd and Radio Nova announced that they had launched a challenge: to create the 15th track of the album Born a Loser in 15 days with the listeners of Radio Nova. For the featuring, listeners chose the French band L'Impératrice who agreed to collaborate with Myd. The track, titled "Loverini", released on 18 June 2021.

Discography

Albums

Extended plays

Singles

Other appearances

Songwriting and production credits

Albums

Tracks

Remixes

References

Living people
1987 births
Because Music artists
French composers
French electronic musicians
French house musicians
French male composers
French record producers